The 2018 Hong Kong Open (officially known as the Yonex-Sunrise Hong Kong Open 2018 for sponsorship reasons) was a badminton tournament which took place at the Hong Kong Coliseum in Hong Kong from 13 to 18 November 2018 and had a total prize of $400,000.

Tournament
The 2018 Hong Kong Open was the twenty-fourth tournament of the 2018 BWF World Tour and also part of the Hong Kong Open championships, which had been held since 1982. This tournament was organized by Hong Kong Badminton Association and sanctioned by the BWF.

Venue
This international tournament was held at the Hong Kong Coliseum in Hong Kong.

Point distribution
Below is the point distribution table for each phase of the tournament based on the BWF points system for the BWF World Tour Super 500 event.

Prize money
The total prize money for this tournament was US$400,000. Distribution of prize money was in accordance with BWF regulations.

Men's singles

Seeds

 Kento Momota (semi-finals)
 Shi Yuqi (first round)
 Chou Tien-chen (first round)
 Srikanth Kidambi (quarter-finals)
 Chen Long (second round)
 Son Wan-ho (champion)
 Anthony Sinisuka Ginting (second round)
 Kenta Nishimoto (final)

Finals

Top half

Section 1

Section 2

Bottom half

Section 3

Section 4

Women's singles

Seeds

 Tai Tzu-ying (semi-finals)
 Akane Yamaguchi (quarter-finals)
 P. V. Sindhu (second round)
 Chen Yufei (first round)
 Carolina Marín (quarter-finals)
 Ratchanok Intanon (final)
 Nozomi Okuhara (champion)
 He Bingjiao (quarter-finals)

Finals

Top half

Section 1

Section 2

Bottom half

Section 3

Section 4

Men's doubles

Seeds

 Marcus Fernaldi Gideon / Kevin Sanjaya Sukamuljo (champions)
 Li Junhui / Liu Yuchen (first round)
 Liu Cheng / Zhang Nan (first round)
 Takeshi Kamura / Keigo Sonoda (final)
 Chen Hung-ling / Wang Chi-lin (first round)
 Kim Astrup / Anders Skaarup Rasmussen (quarter-finals)
 Mads Conrad-Petersen / Mads Pieler Kolding (first round)
 Fajar Alfian / Muhammad Rian Ardianto (semi-finals)

Finals

Top half

Section 1

Section 2

Bottom half

Section 3

Section 4

Women's doubles

Seeds

 Yuki Fukushima / Sayaka Hirota (champions)
 Misaki Matsutomo / Ayaka Takahashi (quarter-finals)
 Chen Qingchen / Jia Yifan (first round)
 Greysia Polii / Apriyani Rahayu (semi-finals)
 Mayu Matsumoto / Wakana Nagahara (first round)
 Shiho Tanaka / Koharu Yonemoto (semi-finals)
 Lee So-hee / Shin Seung-chan (final)
 Jongkolphan Kititharakul / Rawinda Prajongjai (second round)

Finals

Top half

Section 1

Section 2

Bottom half

Section 3

Section 4

Mixed doubles

Seeds

 Zheng Siwei / Huang Yaqiong (withdrew)
 Wang Yilü / Huang Dongping (final)
 Tang Chun Man / Tse Ying Suet (second round)
 Mathias Christiansen / Christinna Pedersen (first round)
 Zhang Nan / Li Yinhui (first round)
 Chan Peng Soon / Goh Liu Ying (first round)
 Yuta Watanabe / Arisa Higashino (champions)
 Goh Soon Huat / Shevon Jemie Lai (second round)

Finals

Top half

Section 1

Section 2

Bottom half

Section 3

Section 4

References

External links
 Tournament Link

Hong Kong Open (badminton)
Hong Kong Open (badminton)
Hong Kong Open (badminton)
Hong Kong Open (badminton)